Promalactis quadriloba is a moth of the family Oecophoridae. It is found in, Guizhou, China.

The wingspan is about 9-9.5 mm. The ground colour of the forewings is yellowish brown with white markings edged with black scales. The hindwings and cilia are grey.

Etymology
The specific name is derived from the Latin prefix quadri- (meaning four) and the suffix -lobus (meaning lobe) and refers to the three apical lobes and the ventral process of the valva.

References

Moths described in 2013
Oecophorinae
Insects of China